Franco Magnani (born 29 April 1938) is an Italian racing cyclist. He won stage 15 of the 1963 Giro d'Italia.

References

External links
 

1938 births
Living people
Italian male cyclists
Italian Giro d'Italia stage winners
Place of birth missing (living people)
People from Cesena
Sportspeople from the Province of Forlì-Cesena
Cyclists from Emilia-Romagna